Joseph Pearce (born February 12, 1961), is an English-born American writer, and  Director of the Center for Faith and Culture at Aquinas College in Nashville, Tennessee, before which he held positions at Thomas More College of Liberal Arts in Merrimack, New Hampshire, Ave Maria College in Ypsilanti, Michigan and Ave Maria University in Ave Maria, Florida.

Formerly aligned with the National Front, a white supremacist group, he converted to Roman Catholicism in 1989, repudiated his earlier views, and now writes from a Catholic perspective and espouses Monarchism and Catholic Social Teaching. He is a co-editor of the St. Austin Review and editor-in-chief of Sapientia Press. He also teaches Shakespearian literature for an online Catholic curriculum provider.

Pearce has written biographies of literary figures, often Christian, including William Shakespeare, J. R. R. Tolkien, Oscar Wilde, C. S. Lewis, G. K. Chesterton, Aleksandr Solzhenitsyn and Hilaire Belloc. His books have been translated into at least nine languages.

Biography

Early life

Joseph Pearce was born in Barking, London, and brought up in Haverhill, Suffolk. His father, Albert Arthur Pearce, was a heavy drinker with a history of brawling in pubs with Irishmen and non-Whites, had an encyclopedic knowledge of English poetry and British military history, and an intense nostalgia for the vanished British Empire. In 1973 the family moved to Barking in the East End of London, so that the Pearce boys would grow up with Cockney accents. Pearce had been a compliant pupil at the school in Haverhill, but at Eastbury comprehensive school in Barking he led the racist disruption of the lessons taught by a young Pakistani British mathematics teacher.

Neo-Nazism

At 15, Pearce joined the youth wing of the National Front, an anti-Semitic and white supremacist political party advocating the compulsory repatriation of all immigrants and British-born non-Whites. He came to prominence in 1977 when he set up Bulldog, the NF's openly racist newspaper. Like his father, Pearce became an enthusiastic supporter of Ulster Loyalism during the Troubles from 1978, and joined the Orange Order, a militantly anti-Catholic secret society closely linked to Ulster Loyalist paramilitary organizations. In 1980, he became editor of Nationalism Today, advocating white supremacy. Pearce was twice prosecuted and imprisoned under the Race Relations Act of 1976 for his writings, in 1981 and 1985. At one stage, he contacted John Tyndall to suggest coalition talks with the British National Party, but Tyndall rejected the plan. Pearce was a close associate of Nick Griffin, whom he helped to oust Martin Webster from the NF's leadership. As a spokesman for the Strasserite Political Soldier faction within the NF, Pearce argued for white supremacy, publishing the Fight for Freedom! pamphlet in 1984. At the same time, however, Pearce adopted the group's support for ethnopluralism, contacting the Iranian embassy in London in 1984 in a vain attempt to secure funding from the Government of the Islamic Republic of Iran. Pearce became a leading member of a new NF political faction known as the Flag Group, writing for its publications and contributing to its ideology. Pearce notably argued, based on the writings of G.K. Chesterton and Hilaire Belloc, for distributism as an alternative to both Marxism and Laissez faire Capitalism in a 1987 article for the party magazine Vanguard.

Conversion

Pearce decided to convert to Catholicism during his second prison term (1985-1986). He was received into the Catholic Church during Mass at Our Lady Mother of God Church in Norwich, England on Saint Joseph's Day, 19 March 1989. Following the Mass, the women of the parish held a surprise party for Pearce, accompanied by a cake with, "Welcome Home, Joe", emblazoned on it. Pearce has attributed his conversion to reading books by Catholic authors G. K. Chesterton, John Henry Newman, J.R.R. Tolkien, and Hilaire Belloc.

Ed West, writing about Pearce's conversion in The Catholic Herald in 2010, called his subject "a happy man" and one of the English-speaking world's leading Catholic biographers, hard to square with "the figure familiar to anti-racist campaigners of the Seventies and Eighties: the pugnacious and frightening leader of the Young National Front".

Biographer

Catholic subjects

As a Catholic author, Pearce has focused mainly on the life and work of English Catholic writers, such as J. R. R. Tolkien, G. K. Chesterton and Hilaire Belloc. The Guardian commented that Old Thunder: A Life of Hilaire Belloc "skates over" Belloc's anti-semitism, "the central disfiguring fact of his oeuvre".

He chose the pen name "Robert Williamson" after a character in the Ulster Loyalist ballad The Old Orange Flute, who, like Pearce, is an Orange Order member who converts to Roman Catholicism. Pearce's biography of G. K. Chesterton, Wisdom and Innocence: A Life of G. K. Chesterton, was published, under the pseudonym of Robert Williamson, by Hodder and Stoughton in 1996. Jay P. Corrin, reviewing the book for The Catholic Historical Review, called it "a venture of love and high praise", but which adds little to existing biographies. Its contribution, Corrin wrote, is its focus on Chesterton's religious vision and personal relationships, contrasting his friendly style with the combative Belloc.

Pearce's 2000 biography The Unmasking of Oscar Wilde focused on the conflict between Oscar Wilde's homosexuality and his lifelong attraction to the Roman Catholic Church and how it was finally settled by his reception into the Church on his deathbed in Paris.

In a review for The Wildean, Michael Seeney, described Pearce's biography, as "badly written and muddled", "woefully poorly annotated" and using "odd sources without question". Seeney wrote that it "does not 'unmask' anything", but contains too much "cod psychology" and "hyperbolic cliché" to be a "workmanlike biography".

In 2001, Pearce published a biography of Anglo-South African poet and Catholic convert Roy Campbell, followed in 2003 by an edited anthology of Campbell's poetry and verse translations.

Tolkien

Pearce has also written and published a variety of books of Tolkien studies. His essay Letting the Catholic Out of the Baggins discusses why. In 1997, the British people, in a nationwide poll by the Folio Society, voted The Lord of the Rings the greatest book of the 20th-century and the outraged reactions of literary celebrities such as Howard Jacobson, Griff Rhys Jones, and Germaine Greer, inspired Pearce to write the books Tolkien: Man and Myth (1998), Tolkien, a Celebration (1999) and Bilbo's Journey: Discovering the Hidden Meaning in The Hobbit (2012). All of Pearce's Tolkien-themed books consider his subject's person and writings from a Catholic perspective. Bradley J. Birzer writes in The J. R. R. Tolkien Encyclopedia that scholars had hardly discussed Tolkien's Catholicism until Pearce's Tolkien: Man and Myth, describing the book as "outstanding", treating The Lord of the Rings as a "theological thriller" that "inspired a whole new wave of Christian evaluations".

Pearce has credited his previously published books of Tolkien studies and, "the wave of Tolkien enthusiasm", caused by Peter Jackson's film adaptation of The Lord of the Rings, with making Pearce into a celebrity intellectual following his 2001 emigration from England to the United States.

New life, new world

Pearce married Susannah Brown, an Irish-American woman with family roots in Dungannon, County Tyrone, in St. Peter's Roman Catholic Church in Steubenville, Ohio in April 2001. They have two children. He then received a telephone call and a job offer from the President of Ave Maria College in Michigan. The Pearces arrived in the United States on September 7, 2001. Pearce recalls that his first day of teaching coincided with the September 11 attacks, "making my arrival in the States something of a baptism of fire." The first issue of the Catholic literary magazine the St. Austin Review, which Pearce has coedited ever since alongside Robert Asch, was also published in September 2001.

Pearce was the host of the 2009 EWTN television series The Quest for Shakespeare. Based upon his eponymous book, the show is concerned with Pearce's belief that Shakespeare was a Catholic.

In a 2014 essay, Pearce announced that he had become an American citizen.

In his 2017 stage play Death Comes for the War Poets, according to Catholic Arts Today, Pearce weaves "a verse tapestry," about the military and spiritual journeys of war poets Siegfried Sassoon and Wilfred Owen.

In a 2022 interview with Pearce, Polish journalist Anna Szyda from the literary magazine Magna Polonia explained that the nihilism of modern American poetry is widely noticed and commented upon in the Third Polish Republic as reflecting, "the deleterious influence of the contemporary civilisation on the American soul." In response, Pearce described "the neo-formalist revival" inspired by the late Richard Wilbur and how it has been reflected in recent verse by the Catholic poets whom he and Robert Asch publish in the St. Austin Review. Pearce said that the Catholic faith and optimism of the younger generation of Catholic poets made him feel hope for the future.

In July 2022, Pearce was a speaker at the 41st Annual Conference of the American Chesterton Society in Milwaukee, Wisconsin. Pearce's lecture was titled "How Chesterton Saved Me from anti-Semitism".

Works

Publications

 
 
 
 
 
 
 
 
 
  Published in the United States as 

References

Primary

Secondary

External links

 
 Autobiographical page
 Saint Austin Review
 Clips of Joseph Pearce speaking about his conversion: 1, 2
 Joseph Pearce speaks about his conversion
 The Quest for Shakespeare, EWTN's page for the TV show
 Tolkien's Lord Of The Rings — A Catholic Worldview

1961 births
American Roman Catholic poets
American modernist poets
Ave Maria University faculty
British expatriate academics in the United States
British modernist poets
Catholic philosophers
Converts to Roman Catholicism from atheism or agnosticism
Distributism
English biographers
English emigrants to the United States
English Catholic poets
English Roman Catholics
English Roman Catholic writers
Formalist poets
Living people
National Front (UK) politicians
Naturalized citizens of the United States
People from Dagenham
People from Nashville, Tennessee
Shakespearean scholars
Sonneteers
Tolkien studies